The Seattle Flight are a professional men's basketball based in Lakewood, Washington, approximately forty miles south of Seattle.  They are former members of the International Basketball League and began play in the league in 2013 and ended in 2014.  The team is backed by former Seattle SuperSonics star Shawn Kemp and his wife Marvena. They play their home games at the Pierce College Fort Steilacoom Health Education Center Gymnasium in Lakewood. The team colors of emerald green and gold are to honor their predecessors from the NBA.

Season Results and Standings
The Flight's inaugural season ended with a 1-4 record.

Sat., June 1	Seattle 91 at Bellingham Slam 105 
Sun., June 16	Seattle 110 at Vancouver Volcanoes  122 
Sun., June 23	Vancouver Volcanoes 106 at Seattle 100 
Wed., June 26	Seattle 136 at Japan Nippon Tornadoes 109 
Sun., June 30	Bellingham Slam 117 at Seattle 104

References

External links
 Team page on IBL Website
 Kemp family lands an IBL team for Seattle, IBL website link, April 11, 2013

International Basketball League teams